The Party Goes On (Spanish:La fiesta sigue) is a 1948 Spanish drama film directed by Enrique Gómez and starring Antonio Casal, María Isbert and Juan Vázquez. It is set in the world of bullfighting

Cast

References

Bibliography
 Bentley, Bernard. A Companion to Spanish Cinema. Boydell & Brewer 2008.

External links 

1948 films
1948 drama films
Spanish drama films
1940s Spanish-language films
Films directed by Enrique Gómez
Films scored by Jesús García Leoz
Spanish black-and-white films
1940s Spanish films